Miracle Food Mart was a supermarket chain in Ontario, Canada, owned by Steinberg's, a Quebec-based retailer in the 1970s and 1980s.

Steinberg purchased the Canadian division of Grand Union, with 38 stores, in June 1959 to make its entrance into Ontario. These stores operated under the Steinberg banner until January 1969, when the marketing program of "Miracle Discount Pricing" was introduced and the entire chain of stores was converted to the Miracle Food Mart banner. The marketing philosophy was a simple one, reduce all of the "fancy" advertising such as colour flyers, television and radio spots and offer everyday items at deeply reduced prices as a line item within the weekly black & white flyer. This move proved to be successful as the chain expanded quickly (to approximately 80 stores) over the next ten years, gaining a substantial increase in market share.

In 1973, the Miracle Food Mart division made a revolutionary move to abolish its general-image advertising and to mount a "give-'em-the-facts" consumer-oriented campaign. The program included a formal Consumer Bill of Rights, nutrition booklets, a key to the codes used to mark perishables, and clearly labelled price tags.

The supermarket flourished in the 1970s, and expanded with the Miracle Ultra Mart banner into bigger stores with a wide range of health care and general merchandise. The company spent C$30 million in improvements for its Miracle Food Marts in 1987, creating several large 24-hour food-and-drug stores called Miracle Ultra-Marts. The stores offered fresh fish and deli departments, party-planning services, kitchen centres selling microwave ovens, and hardware and electronic centres. In 1989, the chain was sold to A&P Canada. A&P converted the Miracle Food Mart stores into A&P, Dominion or Food Basics stores, but continued the Ultra Mart banner (dropping the "Miracle"), which it later rebranded as Ultra Food & Drug.

Miracle Food Mart stores were often paired with Miracle Mart discount department stores (another Steinberg chain) in mall settings, some operating as one Miracle Beaucoup store. But in the latter years, they became stand-alone locations at smaller plazas across the Greater Toronto Area.

Locations

Ontario

Most locations continue to be used as supermarkets, but some have been redeveloped for other retail or non-retail used:

See also
List of supermarket chains in Canada
Miracle Mart

References 

1969 establishments in Ontario
1994 disestablishments in Ontario
Retail companies disestablished in 1994
Defunct supermarkets of Canada
Retail companies established in 1969
The Great Atlantic & Pacific Tea Company